Austria competed at the 2002 Winter Olympics in Salt Lake City, United States.

Medalists

Alpine skiing

Men

Men's combined

Women

Women's combined

Biathlon

Men

Men's 4 × 7.5 km relay

 1 A penalty loop of 150 metres had to be skied per missed target. 
 2 Starting delay based on 10 km sprint results. 
 3 One minute added per missed target.

Bobsleigh

Men

Cross-country skiing

Men
Sprint

Pursuit

 1 Starting delay based on 10 km C. results. 
 C = Classical style, F = Freestyle

4 × 10 km relay

Freestyle skiing

Women

Ice hockey

Men's tournament

Preliminary round
Top team (shaded) advanced to the first round.

Consolation round
11th place match

Team Roster
Claus Dalpiaz
Reinhard Divis
Michael Suttnig
Gerhard Unterluggauer
Dominic Lavoie
Thomas Searle
Robert Lukas
Peter Kasper
Andre Lakos
Martin Ulrich
Christph Brandner
Gerald Ressmann
Matthias Trattnig
Oliver Setzinger
Thomas Pöck
Kent Salfi
Mario Schaden
Martin Hohenberger
Gunther Lanzinger
Simon Wheeldon
Wolfgang Kromp
Christian Perthaler
Dieter Kalt
Head coach: Ron Kennedy

Luge

Men

(Men's) Doubles

Women

Nordic combined 

Men's sprint

Events:
 large hill ski jumping
 7.5 km cross-country skiing 

Men's individual

Events:
 normal hill ski jumping
 15 km cross-country skiing 

Men's Team

Four participants per team.

Events:
 normal hill ski jumping
 5 km cross-country skiing

Skeleton

Men

Ski jumping 

Men's team large hill

 1 Four teams members performed two jumps each.

Snowboarding

Men's parallel giant slalom

Women's parallel giant slalom

Women's halfpipe

Speed skating

Women

References
Official Olympic Reports
International Olympic Committee results database
 Olympic Winter Games 2002, full results by sports-reference.com

Nations at the 2002 Winter Olympics
2002
Winter Olympics